Taron Voskanyan (born 22 February 1993) is an Armenian football player who plays for FC Alashkert and the Armenia national football team.

Club career
Born in Yerevan, Armenia, Voskanyan was a pupil of the Pyunik Yerevan football school. Having begun his career with the youth team, he went to play for Pyunik-2, the reserve team, appearing in eight matches in second-tier Armenian First League during the 2010 season. The following season, he played exclusively for the first team in the Armenian Premier League making his debut on 2 April 2011 in a 0–1 away loss against Ulisses playing the full 90 minutes. Months later, Pyunik won the 2011 Armenian Supercup with Voskanyan in the team.

International career
As a player of the main team of Pyunik, Voskanyan was invited into the ranks of the Armenia U-19 junior team at 19 years of age, and first played for the team on 21 October 2011 against peers from Slovakia U-19. Armenia won 2–1. He subsequently had a few more games with the youth team.

He was a player of the Armenia U-21 team scoring on his debut on 12 June 2013 in a 4–1 win against Andorra U-21.

Voskanyan was first called up to the senior Armenia national football team for a match against the Italian national team on 12 October 2012. His debut came in the next game on 14 November 2012 a 4–2 victory against Lithuania with Voskanyan replacing Robert Arzumanyan after 29 minutes.

Career statistics

Club

International

Honours

Club
Pyunik
 Armenian Premier League (1): 2014–15
 Armenian Cup (3): 2012–13, 2013–14, 2014–15
 Armenian Supercup (2): 2011, 2015

Alashkert
 Armenian Premier League (2): 2017–18,2020–21
 Armenian Cup (1): 2018–19

References

External links
 Profile at FFA.am
 
 

1993 births
Living people
Footballers from Yerevan
Armenian footballers
Association football midfielders
Armenia international footballers
FC Pyunik players
Karmiotissa FC players
Nea Salamis Famagusta FC players
Armenian Premier League players
Cypriot First Division players
Armenia under-21 international footballers
Expatriate footballers in Cyprus
Armenian expatriate sportspeople in Cyprus
FC Alashkert players